Raúl Jude (1891–1971) was a Uruguayan lawyer and political figure.

Background

Jude was born in Montevideo in 1891.

A prominent member of the Uruguayan Colorado Party, he was a lawyer by profession.

His son, Raumar Jude, served as a Deputy and Senator.

Public offices

First elected as a Deputy in 1923, he served as Justice Minister under President José Serrato. He subsequently served as Interior Minister under President Gabriel Terra.

He also served as a Senator.

Between 1927 and 1930, and between 1934 and 1937, he served as president of the Uruguayan Football Association

See also

 Politics of Uruguay
 List of political families#Uruguay

References
 :es:Raúl Jude

1891 births
1971 deaths
Jude, Raul
Interior ministers of Uruguay
Members of the Chamber of Representatives of Uruguay
Members of the Senate of Uruguay
Presidents of the Uruguayan Football Association